John Lewin  (1770–1819) was an English-born artist active in Australia.

John Lewin may also refer to:
John Lewin (Manx author), 19th-century author
Jack Lewin (John Philip Lewin, 1915–1990), New Zealand public servant, unionist and lawyer

See also
Jonathan Levin (disambiguation)